Parasutterella secunda is a Gram-negative, nonsaccharolytic, strictly anaerobic, non-spore-forming, nonmotile bacterium of the genus Parasutterella in the family Sutterellaceae, isolated from human faeces. Colonies of  Parasutterella secunda are translucent to beige colored.

References

External links
Type strain of Parasutterella secunda at BacDive -  the Bacterial Diversity Metadatabase

Burkholderiales
Bacteria described in 2011